Ignacio Urrutia Bonilla (born 16 September 1957) is a Chilean politician who has served in the Chamber of Deputies since 2002.

Urrutia is a supporter of Augusto Pinochet. In 2021, he campaigned and voted against the legalization of same-sex marriage in the National Congress of Chile, calling it "a light show or cover to distract from the situations being lived through in Chile today."

References

External links
 

1957 births
Living people
21st-century Chilean politicians
Chilean anti-same-sex-marriage activists
Chilean anti-communists
Chilean people
Independent Democratic Union politicians
Republican Party (Chile, 2019) politicians